Words of Chinese origin have entered the English language and many European languages. Most of these were loanwords from Chinese itself, a term covering those members of the Chinese branch of the Sino-Tibetan language family.  However, Chinese words have also entered indirectly via other languages, particularly Korean, Japanese and Vietnamese, that have all used Chinese characters at some point and contain a large number of Chinese loanwords.

Different sources of loan words 
English words with Chinese origin usually have different characteristics depending how the words were spread to the West. Despite the increasingly widespread use of Standard Mandarin among Chinese people, English words that are based on Mandarin are relatively few.

Some words spread to the West in the following ways:

via missionaries who lived in China. These have heavy Latin influence due to Portuguese and Spanish missionaries.
via sinologists who lived in China. These have heavy French influence due to the long history of French involvement in Sinology.
via the maritime trade route, e.g. tea, Amoy, cumshaw etc. Heavily influenced by the Amoy dialect in southern seaports.
via the early immigrants to the US in the gold rush era, e.g. chop suey. Heavily influenced by the Toisan dialect.
via the multi-national colonization of Shanghai. Influenced by many European countries, as well as Japan.
via the British colonization of Hong Kong, e.g. cheongsam. Heavily influenced by Cantonese.
via modern international communication, especially after the 1970s when the People's Republic of China opened its Bamboo Curtain to let its people migrate to various countries, e.g. wushu, feng shui. Heavily influenced by Mandarin.
via Japanese and (possibly) Korean and Vietnamese. These languages have borrowed large amounts of Chinese vocabulary in the past, written in Chinese characters. The pronunciation of such loanwords is not based directly on Chinese, but on the local pronunciation of Chinese loanwords in these languages, known as Sino-Japanese, Sino-Korean, and Sino-Vietnamese. In addition, the individual characters were extensively used as building blocks for local neologisms with no counterpart in the original Chinese, resulting in words whose relationship to the Chinese language is similar to the relationship between new Latinate words (particularly those that form a large part of the international scientific vocabulary) and Latin. Such words are excluded from the list.

Though all these following terms originated from China, the spelling of the English words depends on which dialect the transliterations came from.

The list

See also
 List of Chinese words of English origin
 List of Spanish words of Chinese origin
:Category:Chinese words and phrases
:Category:Cantonese words and phrases
:Category:Mandarin words and phrases
:Category:Chinese martial arts terms
 Chinese Pidgin English; Chinglish; Singlish

References

External links 
 Chinese Loanwords
 English Words from Chinese

Chinese language
Chinese